Phosinella seguenziana is a species of minute sea snail, a marine gastropod mollusk or micromollusk in the family Rissoinidae.

Description

Distribution
This species occurs in the Red Sea.

References

 Vine, P. (1986). Red Sea Invertebrates. Immel Publishing, London. 224 pp.

External links
 Issel, A. (1869). Malacologia del Mar Rosso. Ricerche zoologiche e paleontologiche. Biblioteca Malacologica, Pisa. xi + 387 pp., pls 1-5

Rissoinidae
Gastropods described in 1869